Ned Hanlon may refer to:

 Ned Hanlon (politician), former Premier of Queensland
 Ned Hanlon (baseball), baseball player and manager

See also
Ned Hanlan, rower